The Central District of Ravansar County is a district (bakhsh) in Ravansar County, Kermanshah Province, Iran. At the 2006 census, its population was 36,864, in 8,238 families.  The District has one city: Ravansar. The District has four rural districts (dehestan): Badr Rural District, Dowlatabad Rural District,  Hasanabad Rural District, and Zalu Ab Rural District.

References 

Ravansar County
Districts of Kermanshah Province